Voice of Witness is a non-profit organization that uses oral history to illuminate contemporary human rights crises in the U.S. and around the world through an oral history book series (published by McSweeney's) and an education program. Voice of Witness publish books that present narratives from survivors of human rights crises including: exonerated men and women; residents of New Orleans before, during, and after Hurricane Katrina; undocumented workers in the United States; and persons abducted and displaced as a result of the civil war in southern Sudan. The Voice of Witness Education Program brings these stories, and the issues they reflect, into high schools and impacted communities through oral history-based curricula and holistic educator support.

By using personal narratives, the series seeks to empower witnesses and survivors, generate awareness about social injustices and human rights issues, and provide documentation for educators, advocates, and policymakers. The editors of Voice of Witness utilize interviews, primary source documents, and extensive fact checking to construct the stories presented in each book. Dave Eggers, Voice of Witness co-founder and author, describes the project as "a partnership between the people telling their stories and the people transmitting them to the reader."

The Voice of Witness book series was founded in 2004 by author Dave Eggers and physician Lola Vollen, M.D. Mimi Lok joined in 2008 as Executive Director & Executive Editor, and turned Voice of Witness into a 501(c)(3) nonprofit. Voice of Witness is based in San Francisco, California.

Books

 Surviving Justice: America's Wrongfully Convicted and Exonerated (2005). Co-edited by Dave Eggers and Lola Vollen. 
 Voices from the Storm: The People of New Orleans on Hurricane Katrina and Its Aftermath (2006). Co-edited by Lola Vollen and Chris Ying. 
 Underground America: Narratives of Undocumented Lives (2008). Edited by Peter Orner. 
 En Las Sombras De Estados Unidos (2009) (The Spanish Language edition of Underground America.). Edited by Peter Orner  and Sandra Hernandez. 
 Out of Exile: The Abducted and Displaced People of Sudan (2008). Edited by Craig Walzer. 
 Hope Deferred: Narratives of Zimbabwean Lives (2010). Edited by Peter Orner and Annie Holmes. 
 Nowhere to Be Home: Narratives from Survivors of Burma's Military Regime (2010). Edited by Maggie Lemere and Zoë West. 
 Patriot Acts: Narratives of Post-9/11 Injustice (2011). Edited by Alia Malek. 
 Inside This Place, Not of It: Narratives from Women's Prisons (2011). Edited by Ayelet Waldman and Robin Levi. 
 Throwing Stones at the Moon: Narratives from Colombians Displaced by Violence (2012). Edited by Sibylla Brodzinsky and Max Schoening. 
 Refugee Hotel (2012). Edited by Juliet Linderman, Photography by Gabriele Stabile. 
 High-Rise Stories: Narratives from Chicago Public Housing (2013). Edited by Audrey Petty. 
 Invisible Hands: Voices from the Global Economy (2014). Edited by Corinne Goria. 
 Palestine Speaks: Narratives of Life Under Occupation (2014). Edited by Cate Malek, Mateo Hoke. 
 The Voice of Witness Reader: Ten Years of Amplifying Unheard Voices (2015). Edited by Dave Eggers. 

 Chasing the Harvest: Migrant Workers in California Agriculture (2017). Edited by Gabriel Thompson. 

 Lavil: Life, Love, and Death in Port-au-Prince (2017). Edited by Evan Lyon, Peter Orner.  
 Six by Ten: Stories from Solitary (2018). Edited by Taylor Pendergrass. 
 Say it Forward: A Guide to Social Justice Storytelling (2018). Edited by Claire Kiefer, Cliff Mayotte, Erin Vong, Natalie Catasús. 
 Solito, Solita: Crossing Borders with Youth Refugees from Central America (2019). Edited by Jonathan Freedman, Steven Mayers. 
 How We Go Home: Voices from Indigenous North America (2020). Edited by Sara Sinclair. 
 Mi María: Surviving the Storm: Voices from Puerto Rico (2021). Edited by Marci Denesiuk, Ricia Anne Chansky.

Reception
Critical reception for the Voice of Witness series has been positive. Publishers Weekly lauded Underground America as "no less than revelatory." The San Francisco Chronicle described Out of Exile as "[e]ssential...an admirable project." Chronicle reviewer John Freeman wrote: "Many of those who do survive (the Sudanese civil war) escape with nothing but their story, something this essential collection of oral testimony records and, in a realistic way, celebrates."

In its review of Surviving Justice, Boston's Weekly Dig praised the series' use of oral history: “The nature of oral history ... allows the exonerees’ stories to be poignant and indignant without the earnestness, false empathy or guilt that would normally poison such subject matter.” The New Orleans Times Picayune called Voices from the Storm a "powerful book" that "draws its strength from the real voices of real New Orleanians."

VOW in the classroom
Voice of Witness has developed core standard-aligned educational resources, including lesson plans for teaching Surviving Justice and Voices in the Storm in high school classrooms, and for instruction on oral history. According to the Voice of Witness web site, the series has been utilized in both college and high school classrooms around the country, including Balboa High School in San Francisco, California, Bentley School in the San Francisco Bay Area, CUNY, Brown University, Valley High School Louisville, KY, and San Francisco State University. Voice of Witness and the Facing History and Ourselves organization have established a partnership to bring the series to additional classrooms.

Founding editors

Dave Eggers Author, Publisher

Lola Vollen, M.D., Visiting Scholar, Institute for International Studies, University of California, Berkeley; Life After Exoneration Program, Executive Director

Board of Directors/Board of Advisors

Board of directors 
Lupe Poblano, Director & Treasurer

Nicole Janisiewicz, Director & Secretary

Niles Xi’an Lichtenstein, Director

Kristine Leja, Chair

Hilda Vega, Director

Mimi Lok, Co-founder & Executive Director

Founding board of advisors 
Roger Cohn, Former Editor-in-Chief, Mother Jones

Mark Danner, Author, Professor, Graduate School of Journalism, University of California, Berkeley

Harry Kreisler, Executive Director, Institute for International Studies, University of California, Berkeley

Martha Minow, Dean, Harvard Law School, Harvard University

Samantha Power, Professor, John F. Kennedy School of Government, Harvard University

John Prendergast, Co-chair, The Enough Project

Orville Schell, Former Dean, Graduate School of Journalism, University of California, Berkeley

William T. Vollmann, Author

Studs Terkel (Deceased), Author, Oral Historian

See also
 Oral History
 Miscarriage of Justice
 Hurricane Katrina
 Immigration to the United States
 Sudan
 McSweeney's
 Dave Eggers

References

External links
 Official Web site
 McSweeneys.net
 McSweeneys store
 Facebook Fan Page

American non-fiction books
Organizations based in San Francisco
2004 establishments in California